Idiophantis valerieae is a moth of the family Gelechiidae. It is found on La Réunion.
Larvae of this species feed on Syzygium cymosum.

References

Moths described in 2010
Idiophantis